This list is made up of notable people born or resides in Quezon City, Philippines.

National heroes and patriots
 Melchora Aquino – Filipina revolutionary known as the "Grand Woman of the Revolution" and the "Mother of Balintawak" for her contributions.
Benigno Aquino Jr. – former Philippine senator and opposition leader during Martial Law dictatorship of Ferdinand Marcos

Politics and government 

Corazon Aquino – 11th President of the Philippines
Gloria Macapagal Arroyo – 14th President of the Philippines, 25th Speaker of the House of Representatives of the Philippines
Benigno Aquino III – 15th President of the Philippines
Rob Bonta – 34th Attorney General of California
Tito Sotto  – 23rd President of the Senate of the Philippines, former vice-mayor of Quezon City, actor and comedian
Jose Diokno – 32nd Secretary of the Department of Justice, founding chairman of the Commission on Human Rights and former Philippine senator
Orlando S. Mercado – 20th Secretary of the Department of the Defense and former Philippine senator
Mar Roxas– 24th Secretary of the Interior and Local Government, 38th Secretary of the Department of Transportation and Communications, 26th Secretary of the Department of Trade and Industry, and former Philippine senator
Miriam Defensor Santiago – former Philippine senator
Nikki Coseteng – former Philippine senator
Ricardo Rosario – 189th Associate Justice of the Supreme Court of the Philippines
 Cecilia Muñoz-Palma – Filipino jurist and the first woman Associate Justice of the Supreme Court of the Philippines, member and chairperson of Philippine Constitutional Commission of 1986
Alfredo Benjamin Caguioa – 177th Associate Justice of the Supreme Court of the Philippines
Martin Villarama Jr. – 166th Associate Justice of the Supreme Court of the Philippines
Midas Marquez – 192nd Associate Justice of the Supreme Court of the Philippines
Paquito Ochoa Jr. – 37th Executive Secretary of the Philippines, and former Quezon City Administrator
Mel Mathay – 3rd Chairman of the Metropolitan Manila Authority, and 8th Mayor of Quezon City
Karina Constantino David – former chairperson of the Housing and Urban Development Coordinating Council and Civil Service Commission
Maris Diokno – historian and former chairperson of National Historical Commission of the Philippines
Manuel Morato – former chairperson of the Movie and Television Review and Classification Board and the Philippine Charity Sweepstakes Office.
Romulo Neri – 11th Director-General of the National Economic and Development Authority
Mike Defensor – 28th Secretary of the Department Environment and Natural Resources, former chairperson of the Housing and Urban Development Coordinating Council, and House Representative for ANAKALUSUGAN party-list
Feliciano Belmonte Jr. – 20th & 23rd Speaker of the House of Representatives of the Philippines, and 9th Mayor of Quezon City
 Barry Gutierrez – former House Representative for Akbayan, and former Vice Presidential Spokesperson for Leni Robredo (2016–2022).
 Precious Hipolito – House Representative for the 2nd District of Quezon City
Alfred Vargas – House Representative for Quezon City's 5th district, film and television actor
 Vincent Crisologo – former House Representative for Quezon City's 1st district
Tingting Cojuangco – former Governor of Tarlac
Herbert Bautista – 10th Mayor of Quezon City, film and television actor
Joy Belmonte – 11th Mayor of Quezon City
Emmanuel Bautista – 44th Chief of Staff of the Armed Forces of the Philippines

Literature and the Arts 

Napoleon Abueva– National Artist of the Philippines for Visual Arts – Sculpture
Ryan Cayabyab – National Artist of the Philippines for Music
Jovita Fuentes – National Artist of the Philippines for Music
Francisco Arcellana – National Artist of the Philippines for Literature
Wilfrido Ma. Guerrero -National Artist of the Philippines for Theater 
Amelia Lapeña-Bonifacio – National Artist of the Philippines for Theater
Marilou Diaz-Abaya – National Artist of the Philippines for Film
Augusto Arbizo – visual artist, and art curator
Simkin de Pio – visual artist
Rene Villanueva – playwright and author.
Eric Gamalinda– poet and novelist
Lourd de Veyra – poet, musician, emcee, poet, journalist, TV host, and broadcast personality
Ben Feleo – film director, screenwriter
Khavn De La Cruz – poet and filmmaker

Sciences and education 

Bienvenido Nebres, S.J. – National Scientist of the Philippines for Mathematics, 29th President of the Ateneo de Manila University, 
Joaquin Bernas, S.J. – 28th President of the Ateneo de Manila University, member of the Philippine Constitutional Commission of 1986
Francisco Nemenzo Jr. – 18th President of the University of the Philippines
Fidel Nemenzo – 11th Chancellor of the University of the Philippines Diliman
Randy David – sociologist
Renato Constantino – historian
Elena Rivera Mirano – academic in art studies, and music scholar

Journalism and media 

Betty Go-Belmonte – journalist, newspaper publisher, co-founder of Philippine Daily Inquirer, The Philippine STAR and Pilipino Star Ngayon
Chit Estella – journalist and professor known for having been instrumental in the founding of the Philippine Center for Investigative Journalism and of Vera Files
Cheche Lazaro – broadcast journalist and the founding President of Probe Productions Inc.
Kara David – journalist and television host
Atom Araullo – journalist and television host
 Mariz Umali – television news anchor and journalist
Bernadette Sembrano – television news anchor and journalist
 Raffy Tima – journalist, producer and TV presenter

Entertainment 

Johnny Delgado – film and television actor
John Arcilla – film and television actor
Dingdong Dantes – actor and TV host
Carlo Aquino – film, socialite, good moral and movie actor, and singer
Kris Aquino – film and socialite, television actress, and television show host
Harlene Bautista – former child star, film and television actress
Ramon Bautista – actor, comedian, television host, film producer, writer, commercial model, and educator.
Jelo The Weirdo – rapper
 JM Yosures – singer
 Mich Dulce – Filipina fashion designer
 Janice De Belen – actress
 Kris Bernal – actress
 Jolo Revilla – actor and politician
 Arjo Atayde – film and television actor
 Gelli de Belen – television host and actress
 Dina Bonnevie – movie actress
 Niana Guerrero – content creator 
 Gee-Ann Abrahan – actress
 Robi Domingo – VJ, actor, dancer, host
 Carolyn Fe – singer and actress
 Johan Santos – actor, television presenter
 Mark Luz – actor, model

Sports 
Jovy Marcelo – race car driver who was killed in an accident during practice for the 1992 Indianapolis 500.
 Denice Zamboanga – mixed martial artist
 Michele Gumabao – volleyball player

See also
List of people from Metro Manila

References

People from Quezon City
Quezon City